Gorka Larrea García (born 7 April 1984) is a Spanish former footballer who played as a midfielder.

Club career
Larrea was born San Sebastián, Gipuzkoa. A product of Real Sociedad's youth system, he first appeared for its main squad on 23 May 2004, playing 20 minutes in a 4–1 away win against Real Madrid (his only game of the season. He added a further three late substitute appearances in the following campaign). For 2006–07 he was loaned to Segunda División club UD Almería, playing an important role in the Andalusians' first-ever La Liga promotion.

In July 2007, Larrea returned to the Basques, who now competed in the second level. He appeared in only nine matches during the season, being subsequently released and joining Levante UD also in that tier.

Larrea featured regularly over the course of two division two campaigns, but only played six times in 2010–11's top flight – 235 minutes of action – in spite of having previously renewed his contract, leaving in June 2011 and signing with CD Numancia in the second tier. He scored his first and only goal for the Soria team on 27 August 2011, helping to a 1–1 draw at CD Alcoyano.

On 11 June 2014, Larrea signed with Major League Soccer's Montreal Impact after training for a month with the club. In early 2016 he switched to the North American Soccer League, having agreed to a deal at Indy Eleven.

International career
Larrea represented Spain at various youth levels. He was part of the squad that won the 2001 UEFA European Under-16 Championship, and also helped the under-23s win the 2005 Mediterranean Games.

Honours
Spain U16
UEFA European Under-16 Championship: 2001

Spain U23
Mediterranean Games: 2005

References

External links

1984 births
Living people
Spanish footballers
Footballers from San Sebastián
Association football midfielders
La Liga players
Segunda División players
Segunda División B players
Tercera División players
Antiguoko players
Real Sociedad B footballers
Real Sociedad footballers
UD Almería players
Levante UD footballers
CD Numancia players
Major League Soccer players
North American Soccer League players
CF Montréal players
Indy Eleven players
Spain youth international footballers
Spain under-21 international footballers
Spain under-23 international footballers
Competitors at the 2005 Mediterranean Games
Mediterranean Games medalists in football
Mediterranean Games gold medalists for Spain
Spanish expatriate footballers
Expatriate soccer players in Canada
Expatriate soccer players in the United States
Spanish expatriate sportspeople in Canada
Spanish expatriate sportspeople in the United States